Xiao Jianhua (born 13 January 1972) is a Chinese-Canadian businessman and billionaire known for managing assets for descendants of prominent Chinese leaders. He was reported to have been abducted from Hong Kong to Mainland China in 2017. His reported trial was denied to Canadian diplomats by China.

Early life
Xiao was born in 1972 to a schoolteacher from Feicheng, Shandong, China.

Xiao attended Peking University at age 14 on a scholarship, and he was a member of the Communist Party of China on campus. He was opposed to the Tiananmen Square protests of 1989. He received a law degree from Peking University.

Career
Xiao began his career in business by selling IBM and Dell computers near the Peking University campus in the 1990s. He also worked with Microsoft. Within a few years, he was worth an estimated $150 million.

Xiao is the owner of Tomorrow Holding (trading as Tomorrow Group), a diversified investment company involved with banking, insurance, real estate development, coal, cement and rare earth minerals. According to The New York Times, he owns non-controlling stakes in Ping An Insurance, Harbin Bank, Huaxia Bank and the Industrial Bank through a series of other investment vehicles, in addition to being the major shareholder in Baotou Tomorrow Technology.

Xiao reportedly, "worked on behalf of a number of powerful families," in China over the course of his career, and he has been described by The New York Times as "a banker for the ruling class." By 2016, he was worth an estimated $6 billion. Xiao's connections with relatives of China's government leaders were demonstrated by his purchase of a 50% stake in CCB International Yuanwei Fund Management, an investment management company owned by Qi Qiaoqiao, Xi Jinping's sister. According to news reports, Xiao was also involved with the business Pacific Securities, a company later accused of facilitating money laundering.

Beijing Beida Tomorrow Resources Technology 
Xiao's business empire started with "Beijing Beida Tomorrow Resources Technology", a company that was 20% owned by Peking University Resources Group. In 1999, the company acquired a 47% stake in an intermediate parent company of Baotou Tomorrow Technology (formerly known as Baotou Yellow River Chemical Industry) from Baotou Municipal Government. Beijing Beida Tomorrow Resources Technology also held the right to nominate three out of the company's five directors, as well as the chairman of the board and general manager of the intermediate parent company. The intermediate parent company was renamed Baotou Beida Tomorrow Resources Technology. In 1999, Xiao Jianhua was nominated as the chairman of Baotou Tomorrow Technology, while Zhou Hongwen, his wife, was the president of Beijing Beida Tomorrow Resources Technology.

Tomorrow Holding 
According to a 2015 annual report published by Baotou Tomorrow Technology, Tomorrow Holding is currently owned by Xiao's cousin, Xiao Weihua, who has a 29% stake in the company. It has been reported that Xiao Jianhua owns his assets through relatives or his wife, but not directly himself. According to one publication, Tomorrow Holding was originally owned by Xiao and his wife, who together had a 50% stake.

In 2000, Tomorrow Holding and its associate companies owned shares of 5.75% in Shanghai Ace. However, Xiao Jianhua and his wife, Zhou Hongwen, as well as four other people associated with Tomorrow Holding, were elected as Shanghai Ace's new directors, though only seven new directors were elected that year, and the board consisted of only 13 directors total. The only new director with no apparent connection to Tomorrow Holding was the new chairman of Shanghai Ace, Deng Jingshun, who later became vice-president of Tomorrow Holding. The move made Tomorrow Holding having an absolute majority in the board of the listed company.

In 2008, Tomorrow Holding sold their stake in Baotou Tomorrow Technology to Zhengyuan Investment, at that time majority owned by Beijing Beida Jade Bird for 30% (an associate company of Peking University) and other companies.

However, In 2012, Tomorrow Holding bought back a 36% stake in Zhengyuan Investment from shareholders other than Beijing Beida Jade Bird. In turn, Zhengyuan Investment owned a 34.60% stake in Baotou Tomorrow Technology and a 95% stake in Baotou Beipu Industry, of which 5% Beipu Industry is owned by Xiao Weihua. Baotou Beipu Industry owns an additional 0.25% stake in Baotou Tomorrow Technology.

Chinese regulators have since taken control of many Tomorrow Holding companies including Huaxia Life, Tianan Life Insurance, Tianan Property Insurance, New Times Trust, Yi'An Property Insurance, and New China Trust, the China Banking and Insurance Regulatory Commission.

Criminal case
According to a report published in 2017, orders for Xiao's detention had been given in 2013, but contacts within the Chinese government had informed him first and he had fled to Hong Kong. He resided at the Four Seasons Hotel there.

On January 28, 2017, during the Chinese New Year, Xiao was taken from his room in the Four Seasons Hotel Hong Kong by plainclothes Chinese security officers who were not officially authorized to operate there by Hong Kong authorities. Xiao was then transported to Mainland China by boat to avoid immigration checks. Although no official announcement of Xiao's detention has been made by the Chinese government, it was reported that Xiao had close connections with many relatives of party leaders and officials, whose assets he had managed. In particular, Xiao was associated with the so-called Jiang Zemin faction, including the children of Zeng Qinghong and Zhou Yongkang.

In September 2018, a report from the South China Morning Post citing unnamed sources stated that Xiao would soon be brought to trial over the crimes of "manipulating stock and futures markets" and "offering bribes on behalf of institutions".

On August 19, 2022, Xiao was sentenced in China to 13 years in prison for fraud and corruption.

Philanthropy 
Xiao donated $50 million to his alma mater, Peking University, and Tsinghua University. He also pledged a $10 million donation to Harvard University.

Personal life
Xiao is married to Zhou Hongwen, who is from Baotou, Inner Mongolia. He purchased a property in Canada and acquired Canadian citizenship. He also has a diplomatic passport from Antigua and Barbuda, which he acquired several days before his abduction. He also owns properties in the United States, and a private jet.

See also
List of kidnappings
Extraordinary rendition

References

Living people
1970s births
Chinese expatriates in Hong Kong
Canadian people of Chinese descent
Peking University alumni
Businesspeople from Shandong
Chinese billionaires
Canadian businesspeople
Canadian billionaires
Chinese philanthropists
Canadian philanthropists
Chinese company founders
People from Feicheng